Étienne Klein (born 1958) is a French physicist and philosopher of science, born in 1958. A graduate of École Centrale Paris, he holds a DEA (Master of Advanced Studies) in theoretical physics, as well as a Ph.D. in philosophy of science and an accreditation to supervise research (HDR).

Profile
Étienne Klein is a Research director at the Commissariat à l'énergie atomique et aux énergies alternatives (CEA). He is currently head of the Laboratoire des Recherches sur les Sciences de la Matière (LARSIM), a research laboratory belonging to the CEA and located in Saclay near Paris. He took part in several major projects, such as the adjustment of a method of isotopic separation involving the use of lasers, and the study of a particle accelerator with superconducting cavities. At CERN he was involved in the design of the Large Hadron Collider (LHC).

He taught quantum physics and particle physics at Centrale Paris for several years and currently teaches philosophy of science. He is a specialist in the question of time in physics and has written a number of essays on the subject. He is also a member of the Conseil d'analyse de la société, of the conseil scientifique de la Cité des Sciences, of the Conseil de l'Office parlementaire d'évaluation des choix scientifiques et technologiques (OPECST), of the French Academy of Technologies and of the Conseil d'Orientation de l'Institut Diderot. Every Thursday morning he presents a radio chronicle, Le Monde selon Étienne Klein, as well as La Conversation scientifique every Saturday afternoon, on the French public station France Culture.

Étienne Klein practises mountain-climbing and other endurance sports.

Plagiarism affair 
In December 2016, Science magazine, a publication of the  American Association for the Advancement of Science,  reported that Popular French physicist Étienne Klein was responsible of a plagiarism, his work was said to be plagiarizing the novelist Stefan Zweig and other authors.

Chorizo tweet

On July 22, 2022, Klein tweeted a photo that he claimed was an image taken by the James Webb Space Telescope of Proxima Centuri, the closest star to our solar system. A few days later, he admitted that the photo was actually of a slice of chorizo against a black background. He described his tweet as a "form of amusement" and urged his 92,000 Twitter followers to "be wary of arguments from authority".

Distinctions and awards 
 Officier dans l’Ordre des Palmes académiques
 Award for the best scientific book of the year 1993 in Germany for Conversations avec le Sphinx, les paradoxes en physique
 Prix Jean Perrin for popularizing science from the Société française de physique in 1997 
 Grammaticakis-Neumann Award from the Académie des sciences in 2000
 Award for the best book of scientific literature of the year for L’Atome au pied du mur et autres nouvelles
 Prix Budget from the Académie des sciences morales et politiques in 2000
 Prix « La science se livre » 2003 for Les Tactiques de Chronos
 Prix Jean Rostand in 2004
 Prix Thorel for Galilée et les Indiens. Allons-nous liquider la science ? in 2008
 Chevalier de la Légion d’honneur, promotion du 1er janvier 2010
 Prix Thorel from the Académie des sciences morales et politiques in 2010

Bibliography 
 Conversations avec le Sphinx, les paradoxes en physique, 1991
 Regards sur la matière. Des quanta et des choses, avec Bernard d'Espagnat, 1993
 Le Temps, 1995
 Le Temps et sa flèche [actes du colloque], dir. Étienne Klein and Michel Spiro, 1996
 L’Atome au pied du mur et autres nouvelles, 2000
 L’Unité de la physique, 2000
 La Quête de l’unité. L’Aventure de la physique, with Marc Lachièze-Rey, 2000
 Sous l’atome, les particules
 La Physique quantique
 Trésor des sciences : dictionnaire des concepts, co-author (dir. Michel Serres)
 Moi, U235 noyau radioactif, with Bernard Bonin and Jean-Marc Cavedon, 2001
 Le temps existe-t-il ?, Collection Les petites pommes du savoir, 2002
 La science nous menace-t-elle ?, 2003
 Les Tactiques de Chronos, 2003
 Petit voyage dans le monde des quanta, 2004
 Il était sept fois la révolution, Albert Einstein et les autres, 2005
 Le Temps qui passe, 2006
 Le facteur temps ne sonne jamais deux fois, 2007
 Les Secrets de la matière, 2008
 Galilée et les Indiens. Allons-nous liquider la science ?, 2008
 Pourquoi je suis devenu chercheur scientifique, 2009
 Discours sur l’origine de l’univers, 2010
 La Science en jeu, written with Jean-Michel Besnier, Hervé Le Guyader and Heinz Wismann, 2010
 Le Small bang des nanotechnologies, 2011
 Anagrammes renversantes, ou le sens caché du monde, with Jacques Perry-Salkow, 2011
 Rugby quantique, with Jonny Wilkinson and Jean Illiopoulos, 2011
 D'où viennent les idées (scientifiques)?, 2013
 En cherchant Majorana. Le physicien absolu, 02/2015
 Y a-t-il eu un instant zéro ?, 03/2015
 Le pays qu'habitait Albert Einstein, 2016
 Tout n'est pas relatif, 2017
 Sauvons le progrès, dialogue avec Denis Lafay, 2017
 Matière à contredire, essai de philo-physique, 2018
 Le goût du vrai, 2020

Filmography 
 Quels temps font-ils ?, co-author with Marc Lachièze-Rey, film directed by Hervé Lièvre, 2001

References 

1958 births
Scientists from Paris
21st-century French philosophers
École Centrale Paris alumni
French science writers
French physicists
Philosophers of physics
Theoretical physicists
Living people
Science communicators
People associated with CERN
Officers of the Ordre national du Mérite